is a Japanese volleyball player and Olympic champion. She was a member of the Japanese winning team, at the 1964 Summer Olympics in Tokyo.

References

External links

 Video of the moments of victory and of awarding gold medal in 1964 Tokyo Olympics

1941 births
Living people
Olympic volleyball players of Japan
Volleyball players at the 1964 Summer Olympics
Olympic gold medalists for Japan
Japanese women's volleyball players
Olympic medalists in volleyball
Asian Games medalists in volleyball
Volleyball players at the 1962 Asian Games
Medalists at the 1964 Summer Olympics
Medalists at the 1962 Asian Games
Asian Games gold medalists for Japan